Miss You is a track by UK rock band Feeder, which was released on 3 March 2008 as a precursor to the band's upcoming full-length studio album Silent Cry. The song was made available to download for free from the band's official website and was downloaded 8000 times on its first day. It received its first radio play as part Colin Murray's Black Hole segment on BBC Radio 1, a day after its release.

The band also did a competition, asking fans to make a music video for the song. The top 3 videos would be picked by the band, and the winning entry would appear on a future single DVD, which never materialised. The song is credited to being featured on the video game Midnight Club: Los Angeles.

References

External links 
 Feederweb
 

Feeder songs
2008 songs
Songs written by Grant Nicholas